The Cherry Mine disaster was a fire in the Cherry, Illinois, coal mine in 1909, and surrounding events, in which 259 men and boys died. The disaster stands as the third most deadly in American coal mining history.

History

Background

The Cherry Mine had been opened in 1905 by the St. Paul Coal Company to supply coal for the trains of its controlling company, the Chicago, Milwaukee, and St. Paul Railroad. The mine consisted of three horizontal veins, each deeper than the last. Both the main shaft and the secondary shaft contained wooden stairs and ladders. The main shaft was capped by an  steel tipple which controlled a mechanical hoisting cage. A large fan, located in a shunt off the secondary shaft, pushed fresh air into the mine.

The miners included a large number of immigrants, heavily Italian, many of whom could not speak English.  Boys as young as 11 years old also worked the mine.  Rather than a fixed per-hour wage, pay was based on the coal production.

The Cherry Mine Disaster

On Saturday, November 13, 1909, nearly 500 men and boys and three dozen mules were working in the mine.  
An electrical outage earlier that week had forced the workers to light kerosene lanterns and torches, some portable, some set into the mine walls.

Shortly after noon, a coal car filled with hay for the mules caught fire from one of the wall lanterns.
Initially unnoticed and, by some accounts, ignored by the workers, efforts to move the fire only spread the blaze to the timbers supporting the mine.

The large fan was reversed in an attempt to blow out the fire, but this only succeeded in igniting the fan house itself as well as the escape ladders and stairs in the secondary shaft, trapping more miners below. The two shafts were then closed off to smother the fire, but this also had the effect of cutting off oxygen to the miners, and allowing the “black damp,” a suffocating mixture of carbon dioxide and nitrogen, to build up in the mine.

Some 200 men and boys made their way to the surface, some through escape shafts, some using the hoisting cage. Some miners who had already escaped returned to the mine to aid their coworkers. Twelve of these, led by John Bundy, made six dangerous cage trips, rescuing many others. The seventh trip, however, proved fatal when the cage operator misunderstood the miners' signals and brought them to the surface too late - the rescuers and those they attempted to rescue were burned to death.

One group of miners trapped in the mine built a makeshift wall to protect themselves from the fire and poisonous gases. Although without food, they were able to drink from a pool of water leaking from a coal seam, moving deeper into the mine to escape the black damp. Eight days later, the 21 survivors, known as the "eight day men", tore down the wall and made their way through the mine in search of more water, but came across a rescue party instead.  One of those 21 survivors died two days later with complications from asthma.

Aftermath

The following year, as a result of the Cherry Mine disaster, the Illinois legislature established stronger mine safety regulations and in 1911, Illinois passed a separate law, which would later develop into the Illinois Workmen's Compensation Act.

A monument to those who lost their lives was erected on May 15, 1971, by the Illinois Department of Transportation and the Illinois State Historical Society.
These people losing their lives helped spur legislation to keep future miners safe. The centennial commemoration of the Cherry Mine disaster was held in Cherry, November 14–15, 2009. A new monument, located at the Cherry Village Hall, was dedicated to the miners who lost their lives in the disaster.

Footnotes

Further reading

 J.O. Bentall, "The Cherry Mine Murders: Why Four Hundred Workers Were Burned and Suffocated in a Criminal Fire Trap," International Socialist Review, vol. 10, no. 7 (Jan. 1910), pp. 577–586.
 Adriana Colindres, "Reliving a Tragedy," [Springfield, IL] State Journal-Register, Nov. 6. 2009.
 Emilie LeBeau, "Small-Town Cherry Plans Special Events to Commemorate 1909 Mine Disaster," Chicago Tribune, Nov. 12, 2009.
 Karen Tintori, Trapped : The 1909 Cherry Mine Disaster (Illinois), Atria Publishing, 2002.
 Thomas White with Louis Murphy, "Eight Days In A Burning Mine", The World, Oct. 1911.
 "Illinois Disaster All but Forgotten," Chicago Tribune, Jan. 5, 2006, pg. A14.

External links
 

Coal mining disasters in Illinois
1909 disasters in the United States
Bureau County, Illinois
1909 in Illinois
1909 mining disasters
November 1909 events